Frankenberg House may refer to:

Frankenberg House (Josephine Frankenberg House), listed on the National Register of Historic Places in Maricopa County, Arizona
Frankenberg House (D. J. Frankenberg House), listed on the National Register of Historic Places in Maricopa County, Arizona